This article contains information about the literary events and publications of 1548.

Events
unknown dates
Hôtel de Bourgogne opens as a theatre in Paris.
Roger Ascham becomes tutor to Princess Elizabeth, the future Queen Elizabeth I of England.

New books

Prose
Mikael Agricola – Se Wsi Testamenti (first translation of New Testament into Finnish)
Edward Hall (posthumously) – The Union of the Two Noble and Illustre Families of Lancastre and Yorke (commonly called Hall's Chronicle)
Gruffudd Hiraethog –  (posthumous collection of Welsh proverbs by William Salesbury)
Martynas Mažvydas – The Simple Words of Catechism (first printed book in Lithuanian)
Catherine Parr – The Lamentation of a Sinner
Paolo Pino – 
William Salesbury – A Dictionary in Englyshe and Welshe
Nicholas Udall – The first tome or volume of the Paraphrase of Erasmus vpon the newe testamente
Thomas Vicary –

Drama
John Bale – Kynge Johan

Poetry
See 1548 in poetry

Births
May – Carel van Mander, Dutch painter and poet (died 1606)
July 8 – Kim Jang-saeng, Korean scholar, politician and writer (died 1631)
September 2 – Vincenzo Scamozzi, Italian writer on architecture (died 1616)
November – André Guijon, French orator (died 1631)
November 27 – Jacopo Mazzoni, Italian philosopher (died 1598)
Unknown date – Luis Barahona de Soto, Spanish poet (died 1595)

Deaths
February 26 – Lorenzino de' Medici, Italian writer, 33
June 6 – João de Castro, Portuguese explorer and writer, 48
October 27 – Johannes Dantiscus, Polish poet and bishop, 63
Unknown date – Cristoforo di Messisbugo, Italian food writer

References

Years of the 16th century in literature